SS Hestmanden is a Norwegian steamer which sailed in foreign trade during both World War I and World War II, and the only preserved and remaining cargo ship that has sailed in convoys during both world wars. As the only remaining in the Nortraship's fleet, it represents a central part of Norway's war history and maritime history and is a very important protection object. Hestmanden is considered perhaps the most valuable veteran vessel of Norway.

Hestmanden was built in Laksevåg for the Vesteraalens Dampskibsselskab in 1911. During the interwar period and after World War II until the 1970s, Hestmanden sailed as usual in this shipping company's domestic coastal freight route.

In a fairly dilapidated condition, Hestmanden was taken care of by the Norsk Veteranskipsklubb ( a Norwegian club for veteran vessels) in 1979. In 1995 the restoration work started at the Bredalsholmen Veteranship Shipyard in Kristiansand.

Timeline 

1911: Delivered to Vesteraalens Dampskibsselskab (VDS).
1913: First foreign trade sailing.
1917: (World War I) Leased to British authorities.
1919: The lease terminated, the ship returned to VDS.
1940: (World War II) Sailed to Scotland in June and was incorporated into Nortraship.
1947: Remodeled and modernized at Akers Mekaniske Verksted, Oslo.
1955: Sold to Chief Shipwreck and renamed "Vegafjord".
1965: In mooring.
1979: Purchased and saved by the Norsk Veteranskibsklubb, funded by Petter Olsen.
1982: Towed to Trondheim, up to and including 1986 conservation  project to stop further decay.
1992: Towed to Bredalsholmen in Kristiansand. The work started with the granting of money for restoration.
1995: The Storting (The Norwegian Parliament) gave SS Hestmanden status as a war memorial.
1996: The ship was protected by law by the Norwegian Directorate for Cultural Heritage, the Hestmanden Foundation took over the ship.
2002: The hull is completely restored.
2008: Restoration work stopped at the end of the year due to lack of funding.
2011: Re-launched and renamed after restoration, both exactly one hundred years after the first time.
2012: The movie about SS Hestmanden was finished in November.
2017: Officially opened as Norsk krigsseilermuseum (the Norwegian War Sailing Museum).
2020: 25.june: Moved under steam with original engine without tug for the first time since 1964.

Floating museum 
The idea was to enable the ship to be a sailing museum along the coast of Norway as a memorial of the Norwegian wartime sailors.

In September 2011, the steamer was "re-launched" from the yard. It will now be anchored as a museum ship, home ported in Kristiansand. During the baptism ceremony, King Harald was present, together with 240 war time sailors, among others.

After 2011, further restoration and upgrading has been an ongoing process.

Gallery

References

External links 
 Stiftelsen Hestmanden: Official website
 Vest-Agdermuseet - DS Hestmanden

1911 ships
Ships built in Bergen
Steamships of Norway
Ships of Nortraship
World War I merchant ships of Norway
World War II merchant ships of Norway
Museum ships in Norway